Bryotropha galbanella is a moth of the family Gelechiidae. It is found in Denmark, Norway, Sweden, Finland, Estonia, Latvia, Great Britain, France, the Netherlands, Germany, Poland, Austria, the Czech Republic, Italy, Romania and Russia. It is also found in Japan and North America (Alaska and extreme north-western Canada). Furthermore, it was incorrectly recorded from Chile.

The wingspan is 14–18 mm for males and 13–16 mm for females. The forewings are dark ochreous grey, mottled with pale ochre. The hindwings are fuscous grey. Adults have been recorded on wing from May to August.

The larvae feed on Dicranum scoparium. They live in a silken tube. In captivity, 
larvae have also been reared on Homalothecium lutescens. They have a pale brown body.

References

Moths described in 1839
galbanella
Moths of Europe
Moths of Asia
Moths of North America